The Procyon Stakes (Japanese プロキオンステークス) is a Grade 3 horse race for Thoroughbreds aged three and over, run in July over a distance of 1400 metres on dirt at Chukyo Racecourse.

It was first run over the current distance in 1996 and has held Grade 3 status ever since. It was run at Hanshin Racecourse before moving to Chukyo in 2012. The 2006 and 2011 editions were held at Kyoto Racecourse. In 2021 and 2022 the race was run over 1700 metres at Kokura Racecourse.

Winners since 1996

See also
 Horse racing in Japan
 List of Japanese flat horse races

References

Dirt races in Japan